Mark David Charles Griffin (born 25 February 1968) is an English actor known for his role as Trojan on the television series Gladiators.

Early life
Born in Basingstoke, Hampshire, Griffin attended Brighton Hill secondary school. He played squash at a young age and was invited to National Squad Training Camp. He went on to become a bodybuilder.

Career
Griffin's first acting role was in the 1995 TV series Action Man in which he played the live action version of the animated character.

He has since gone onto appear in various films including Daddy Day Care, Dr. Dolittle 2, The Hard Corps and I Am Vengeance (in 2018) and a lead role in Mark L. Lester's 2014 film Dragons of Camelot. He also had TV roles in Curb Your Enthusiasm, NCIS, Doctor Who  and Strike Back: Legacy

Theatre
During May 2015 Griffin starred in the Simon Stephens play Bluebird at the Tabard Theatre London.

Gladiators
Griffin appeared on Gladiators from 1993 to 1996, leaving to concentrate on his acting career.

Action Man
Griffin appeared on Action Man where he played the main character from 1995 to 1997.

Writing
Griffin wrote a book about his time on Gladiators in 1995 called Trojan: My Life with the Gladiators

Personal life
Griffin has a daughter, Gabriella, with fellow former Gladiator Zodiac, Kate Staples.

References

External links 
 
 Mark Griffin fansite

1968 births
20th-century English male actors
21st-century English male actors
English male film actors
English male television actors
Living people
Male actors from Hampshire
People from Basingstoke
Gladiators (1992 British TV series)